Evelyn Brigid Bourke (born 1965) is an Irish businesswoman. She is a non-executive board member of Bank of Ireland plc, Marks and Spencer. Admiral Group plc and of London First. She is also joining the board of AJ Bell plc from July 2021.

Her most recent executive role was as group CEO at Bupa from July 2016 to December 2020.

Early life and education 

She grew up in Tipperary, Ireland. She was one of the first two women in Ireland to qualify as an actuary and holds an MBA from the London Business School.

Career 
Bourke began her career with New Ireland Assurance in 1982 before working in various management roles at Bank of Ireland during 1986–1991.

She worked as principal at Tillinghast Towers Perrin for over 10 years, before moving on to become Finance Director of Nascent Group (2001), Chief Executive Officer of Chase de Vere (2004), Chief Financial Officer of Standard Life UK (2006), Chief Financial Officer of Friends Provident (2009) and Chief Commercial Officer and member of the board at Friends Life UK (2011). She joined Bupa as Chief Financial Officer in September 2012.

Bourke became Bupa’s Acting Group CEO on 4 April 2016 before being appointed permanent Group CEO on 25 July 2016. She established a new strategy focusing the organisation on three core strategic pillars, delivering for its customers, its people making the difference and driving strong and sustainable performance. In September 2020, Bupa announced that Bourke had decided to retire as Group CEO at the end of the year to develop a portfolio career.

In September 2018, she was ranked 16th in the Financial Times annual HERoes list of female global leaders committed to driving workplace gender equality.

Stepping down from Bupa

Bupa Chairman, Roger Davis commented: "Our deepest thanks go to Evelyn for all that she has contributed to Bupa. She leaves the organisation in excellent shape. The hallmark of her leadership has been her systematic focus on Bupa’s customers, putting them front and centre right across the organisation. She has also transformed many of the fundamentals across the Group, investing in technology and operational resilience, and strengthening internal controls and risk management. This has served Bupa incredibly well in our response to the COVID-19 pandemic. Having delivered substantive change, Evelyn has decided that the time is right for her to move onto the next phase of her career and go plural, developing a portfolio career."

Non-executive career

In May 2018, she joined Bank of Ireland Group plc and the Court of Directors of The Governor and Company of the Bank of Ireland as Non-executive Director. She is currently Chair of the Audit Committee and a member of the Risk Committee and has also served on the Nomination and Governance Committee.

She joined the Marks & Spencer Board in February 2021 and is a member of the Board's Audit and Nomination Committees.

She joined the Board of Admiral Group plc from April 2021 and is a member of the Remuneration Committee. 

From July 2021, she will join the Board of AJ Bell plc one of the UK's largest investment platforms.

Bourke was also a Non-Executive Director of BusinessLDN between 2019 and 2021.

She has also served as a Non-Executive Director on a number of boards, including The Children's Mutual, Opportunity Now and IFG Group plc.

Personal life 
She is married and lives in the UK.

References 

1965 births
Living people
People from County Tipperary
Irish actuaries
Alumni of London Business School
Chief executives in the healthcare industry
Irish women in business
Irish chief executives
Bank of Ireland people